Yisrael Zaguri (born 29 January 1990) is an Israeli professional association football player who plays for Bnei Yehuda in the Israeli National League.

Honours

Club
Hapoel Ramat Gan
Israel State Cup: 2013

References 
 

1990 births
Living people
Israeli footballers
Maccabi Haifa F.C. players
Hapoel Petah Tikva F.C. players
Bnei Yehuda Tel Aviv F.C. players
Hapoel Ramat Gan F.C. players
Hapoel Tel Aviv F.C. players
Maccabi Netanya F.C. players
Beitar Jerusalem F.C. players
Bnei Sakhnin F.C. players
Maccabi Petah Tikva F.C. players
Hapoel Umm al-Fahm F.C. players
Israeli Premier League players
Liga Leumit players
Israeli people of Moroccan-Jewish descent
Israel under-21 international footballers
Footballers from Acre, Israel
Association football midfielders